Cherkassy is a rural locality (a selo) in Cherkassky Selsoviet, Ufimsky District, Bashkortostan, Russia. The population was 710 as of 2010. There are 15 streets.

Geography 
Cherkassy is located 28 km northeast of Ufa (the district's administrative centre) by road. Novye Cherkassy is the nearest rural locality.

References 

Rural localities in Ufimsky District